Supreme Records may refer to:
 Supreme Records (Grey Gull subsidiary), a subsidiary of Grey Gull Records in the 1920s
 Supreme Records (Pama subsidiary), a subsidiary of Pama Records
 Supreme Records (Los Angeles), a 1940s rhythm & blues label in Los Angeles
 Supreme Records UK, 1980s UK label

See also
Supreme (disambiguation)